Tinchlik is a station of the Tashkent Metro on Oʻzbekiston Line. The station was opened on 30 April 1991 as part of the extension of the line from Chorsu to Beruniy. The lobby is in the same volume with an underground passage, separated from it only by stained glass.

Above the station design artists worked Mukhamadjon R. and A. Kayumov.

Expanding on the top of the columns are decorated with marble Nurata. The top of each column illuminated lamps.

In the center of the platform hall hung crystal chandeliers in a brass finish (painter A. Fleet).

References

External links 

 Official website

Tashkent Metro stations
Railway stations opened in 1991
1991 establishments in Uzbekistan